Only Yesterday may refer to:

 Only Yesterday (1933 film), an American drama starring Margaret Sullavan
 Only Yesterday (1991 film), a Japanese anime film released in North America in 2016
 "Only Yesterday" (song), a song by the Carpenters
 Only Yesterday (album), a greatest hits album by the Carpenters
 Only Yesterday: The Carpenters Story, a 2007 British TV documentary
 Only Yesterday: An Informal History of the 1920s, a 1931 work of non-fiction by Frederick Lewis Allen
 Only Yesterday, a 1945 novel by S. Y. Agnon